Bowes is a surname shared by several notable people. In Ireland, it is mostly an anglicised form of Ó Buadhaigh
 Barnard Foord Bowes (1769-1812), British major general
 Bill Bowes (1908–1987), English cricketer
 Bob Bowes (1922–1979), English actor and teacher
 Chad Bowes (born 1992), South African cricketer
 Cliff Bowes (1894 – 1929), American silent film actor
 Danny Bowes (born 1960), English musician
 David Bowes (born 1957), American painter
 Edward Bowes (1874–1946), known as Major Bowes, American radio personality
 Elizabeth Bowes (1505–1572), English Protestant exile
 George Bowes (disambiguation), multiple people, including:
George Bowes (1701–1760), English Member of Parliament and businessman
George Bowes (soldier) (1527–1580), English military commander, MP for Morpeth and Knaresborough
George Bowes (rebel) (1517–1556), English commander in border warfare
 G.K. Bowes, American voice actress
 Hollie-Jay Bowes (born 1989), English actress
 Jerome Bowes (died 1616), English ambassador to Russia and Member of Parliament in England
 John Bowes (disambiguation), multiple people
 Lisa Bowes, Canadian sports anchor
 Margie Bowes (1941–2020), American country music singer
 Mark Bowes (born 1973), Scottish footballer
 Martin Bowes (c. 1500–1566), English politician
 Mary Bowes, Countess of Strathmore and Kinghorne (1749–1800), English playwright, among the wealthiest heiresses in Britain of the late 18th century
 Philip Bowes (born 1984), British boxer
 Richard Bowes (born 1944), American author of science fiction and fantasy
 Robert Bowes (disambiguation), multiple people, including:
Robert Bowes (lawyer) (1495–1554), English Master of the Rolls and warden on the Scottish border
Robert Bowes (diplomat) (1535–1597), English diplomat, MP for Knaresborough, Carlisle, Appleby and Cumberland
Robert Bowes (died 1600), MP for Thirsk and Richmond
 Shane Bowes (born 1969), Australian motorcycle speedway rider
 Thomas Bowes (disambiguation), multiple people, including:
Thomas Bowes (translator), English translator
Thomas Bowes (violinist) (born 1960), English violinist and orchestra leader
 Walter Bowes (1882–1957), English-born industrialist and sportsman
 William Bowes (disambiguation), multiple people

See also
 Bowes-Lyon, a Scottish family 

English-language surnames
de:Bowes